Solo Sessions may refer to:
 Solo Sessions (Nikhil Korula EP), 2013
 Solo Sessions Vol. 1: Live at the Knitting Factory, a 2004 live album by John Legend
 Solo Sessions (Chet Atkins album), 2003